The 2022 Kansas Lottery 300 was the 25th stock car race of the 2022 NASCAR Xfinity Series and the 22nd iteration of the event. The race was held on Saturday, September 10, 2022, in Kansas City, Kansas at Kansas Speedway, a 1.500 miles (2.414 km) permanent paved oval-shaped racetrack. The race was decreased from 200 laps to 93 laps, due to inclement weather. Noah Gragson, driving for JR Motorsports, took advantage of the lead on the final restart, and held off his teammate, Justin Allgaier, for his 10th career NASCAR Xfinity Series win, along with his fifth of the season. Ty Gibbs would mostly dominate the race, leading 66 laps. To fill out the podium, Gibbs, driving for Joe Gibbs Racing, would finish 3rd, respectively.

Background 
Kansas Speedway is a 1.5-mile (2.4 km) tri-oval race track in Kansas City, Kansas. It was built in 2001 and hosts two annual NASCAR race weekends. The NTT IndyCar Series also raced there until 2011. The speedway is owned and operated by the International Speedway Corporation.

Entry list 

 (R) denotes rookie driver.
 (i) denotes driver who are ineligible for series driver points.

Practice 
The only 30-minute practice session was held on Friday, September 9, at 4:00 PM CST.

Qualifying 
Qualifying was held on Saturday, September 9, at 4:30 PM CST. Since Kansas Speedway is a tri-oval track, the qualifying system used is a single-car, single-lap system with only one round. Whoever sets the fastest time in the round wins the pole.

Full qualifying results

Race results 
Stage 1 Laps: 45

Stage 2 Laps: 45

Stage 3 Laps: 3*

Standings after the race 

Drivers' Championship standings

Note: Only the first 12 positions are included for the driver standings.

References 

2022 NASCAR Xfinity Series
NASCAR races at Kansas Speedway
Kansas Lottery 300
2022 in sports in Kansas